San Dieguito Heritage Museum is a history museum in Encinitas, California, in the United States. Founded in 1988, the museum displays historical photographs and artifacts from Encinitas and the entire San Dieguito area. 

San Dieguito historically comprises seven communities: Cardiff-by-the-Sea, Del Mar, Encinitas, Leucadia, Olivenhain, Rancho Santa Fe, and Solana Beach in the North County area of San Diego County and their adjacent areas, including parts of southern Carlsbad and northwestern San Diego.

The museum is a nonprofit organization that is primarily staffed by volunteers with limited paid staff. The museum is supported by contributions from its members and the wider community at large.  
In 1993, the museum published San Dieguito Heritage by Maura Wiegand. In 1998, the San Dieguito Heritage Museum received a $5,000 challenge grant from the Thomas C. Ackerman Foundation. In 2007, the Rotarians helped the museum spruce up its new location.

In May 2008, the museum opened a ground-breaking new exhibit on skateboarding in the San Dieguito area. It was the first exhibit of its kind in southern California.  The most recent exhibit is the Bumann Ranch Exhibit.  It will celebrate the placement of the Bumann Ranch on the National Register of Historic Places and the contributions of the Bumanns to record and preserve the history of the Colony of Olivenhain in the San Dieguito region.

The museum regularly provides visiting third-grade school groups with a special local history tour geared to their state-mandated curriculum. Many other tours and programs are available by request. Several special events, including an old-fashioned community barbecue, are held during the year.

Picture gallery

Historic Encinitas Photo Slide Show
Historic Encinitas Photo Slide Show

References

External links
Official website

Museums established in 1988
Museums in San Diego County, California
History museums in California
Encinitas, California